Gypsy is an unincorporated community within Magoffin County, Kentucky, United States.

History
Gypsy was named for a daughter of the local schoolteacher who had successfully led the effort to get the community a post office in 1883. The post office there remained in operation from 1883 until it was discontinued in 1994.

References

Unincorporated communities in Magoffin County, Kentucky
Unincorporated communities in Kentucky